She Loves Me is a filmed version of the 2016 Broadway revival of the musical of the same name by Joe Masteroff, Jerry Bock, and Sheldon Harnick. The musical itself is based on the 1937 play Parfumerie by Miklós László. The production is staged by Scott Ellis and choreographed by Warren Carlyle. It stars Laura Benanti as Amalia Balash, Zachary Levi as Georg Nowack, and Jane Krakowski as Ilona Ritter. The production was performed at Studio 54 from March 17 to June 5, 2016.

The film was broadcast live on BroadwayHD on June 30, 2016, making it the first Broadway production to be live-streamed. It has also aired several times on Great Performances on PBS.

Synopsis 

The plot follows Amalia Balash and Georg Nowack, two workers in a Budapest parfumerie in 1934, who despise each other. Unbeknownst to them, however, they have been sending anonymous letters in a lonely hearts club and are slowly falling in love with each other. A subplot involves the on-again, off-again relationship between the dim-witted Ilona Ritter and the cocky Steven Kodaly, two other co-workers at the parfumerie.

Cast 

 Laura Benanti as Amalia Balash
 Zachary Levi as Georg Nowack
 Jane Krakowski as Ilona Ritter
 Tom McGowan as Ladislav Sipos
 Gavin Creel as Steven Kodaly
 Bryon Jennings as Zoltan Maraczek
 Nicholas Barasch as Arpad Lazlo
 Peter Bartlett as Headwaiter
 Jim Walton as Maraczek's Investigator/Ensemble
 Michael Fatica as Busboy/Ensemble

Cameron Adams, Justin Bowen, Alison Cimmet, Benjamin Eakeley, Gina Ferrall, Jennifer Foote, Andrew Kober, and Laura Shoop appear as additional ensemble members.

Musical Numbers

Production 
The film is executively produced by Stewart F. Lane and Bonnie Comley, the founders of BroadwayHD. While the production is staged by Ellis and Carlyle, the film is directed and shot by David Horn, who had previously worked as a producer and director for Great Performances on PBS. Ten cameras were used to film the performance.

Development 
The idea of making theatre more accessible to patrons not in New York City or who simply did not have the money for a Broadway ticket had been in the works for many years. The inspiration for  a live-streamed performance, however, came quickly after the #Ham4Ham trend in 2015 where Hamilton performers would do a short performance outside the Richard Rogers Theatre for fans waiting to get tickets. These mini-performances were allowed to be filmed and spread on social media using the "Ham4Ham" hashtag. Due to these small shows, which were performed three times a week, Hamilton ticket sales began boosting. The trend was even a segment at the 70th Tony Awards in 2016, where each musical nominated would do a small performance outside their theater for fans. Some inspiration for live-streaming musicals came from the live musicals shown on NBC and Fox such as The Sound of Music, Peter Pan, The Wiz, Grease, and Hairspray.

Comley told The Hollywood Reporter that the goal of the live-streamed performance was, "...to expand the reach of the show outside the physical Broadway theater.”

Release 
The film was live-streamed on BroadwayHD on June 30, 2016. It was historic, as it was the first Broadway musical ever to be live-streamed. Following the streamed performance, the film had a one day theatrical release on December 1 of the same year in a partnership with Fathom Events.

Since then, the film has been aired multiple times as episodes of Great Performances on PBS.

Reception

Audience viewership 
Over sixty countries tuned into the live-streamed performance on BroadwayHD. A Facebook live video showing a teaser of the production garnered 307,000 views and 1,712. Tickets for the event were $9.99, though subscribers of BroadwayHD could watch for free.

Critical reception 
Austin Hill of Onstage Blog described the experience of watching the show live, "...Though I love filmed stage productions, they are always lacking that connection to the event, as though losing the ephemerality of the moment—the precise phenomenological moment of theatre-making.  This was somehow different, and I am not sure I understand why.  It might be because it was REALLY live…"

Accolades 
The streamed production was nominated for three Shorty Awards for Entertainment, Facebook Live, and Live Streaming Video at the 9th Shorty Awards.

References

External links 

 She Loves Me on IMDb

2016 films
2016 romantic comedy films
American musical films
Films based on adaptations
Films based on musicals
Films set in a theatre
Films set in Budapest
Films set in 1934
Films shot in New York City
Filmed stage productions
Musicals by Jerry Bock
Musicals by Sheldon Harnick
2010s English-language films
2010s American films